Nodubothea is a genus of longhorn beetles of the subfamily Lamiinae.

 Nodubothea nodicornis (Bates, 1881)
 Nodubothea zapoteca Monne & Monne, 2008

References

Colobotheini